In India Shipbuilding is new emerging sector where the various types of ship manufacturing currently. There are more than 700 Shipbuilders in India. This is a list of notable shipbuilders and shipyards located in India:
{| class="wikitable sortable"
|+
!Name
!Location
!Type
!Ownership
!Notes
|-
|ABG Shipyard Limited
|Mumbai
|Public
|ABG Group
|Subsidiaries - Western India Shipyard, Vipul shipyard
|-
|Bharati Defence And Infrastructure Limited
|Mumbai
|Public
|
|Subsidiaries - Tebma Shipyard, Pinky Shipyard
|-
|Bombay Dockyard
|Mumbai
|State-owned
|Government of India
|
|-
|Bristol Boats
|Kochi
|Private
|
|
|-
|Chowgule Lavgan Drydocks Chowgule Lavgan Shiprepair Private Limited
|Ratnagiri
|Private
|Chowgule Global
|-
|Cochin Shipyard Limited
|Kochi
|State-owned
|Government of India
|Subsidiaries - Hooghly Cochin Shipyard Limited
|-
|Dempo Shipbuilding & Engineering Private Limited
|Goa
|Private
|Dempo Group
|Subsidiaries - Modest Infrastructure Limited
|-
|Garden Reach Shipbuilders & Engineers
|Kolkata
|State-owned
|Government of India
|Subsidiaries - Rajabagan Dockyard
|-
|Goa Shipyard Limited
|Goa
|State-owned
|Government of India
|
|-
|Hindustan Shipyard Limited
|Visakhapatnam
|State-owned
|Government of India
|
|-
|Kattupalli Shipyard
|Chennai
|Public
|L&T Shipbuilding
|Kattupalli Port is owned by Adani Group
|-
|Mandovi Drydocks
|Goa
|Private
|
|
|-
|Marine Operating Company Private Limited
|Goa
|Private
|MOC Shipyard, Australia
|
|-
|Mazagon Dock Shipbuilders Limited
|Mumbai
|State-owned
|Government of India
|
|-
|Naval Dockyard
|Visakhapatnam
|State-owned
|Government of India
|
|-
|Praga Marine Private Limited
|Kochi
|Private
|
|
|-
|Reliance Naval and Engineering Limited
|Pipavav
|Public
|Reliance Infrastructure
|
|-
|San Marine
|Kakinada
|Private
|
|
|-
|Sea Blue Shipyard Limited
|Kochi
|Private
|
|
|-
|SHOFT Shipyard
|Bharuch
|Private
|SHOFT Industries
|
|-
|The Shalimar Works (1980) Limited
|Kolkata
|State-owned
|Government of West Bengal
|
|-
|Timblo Drydocks Private Limited
|Goa
|Private
|
|
|-
|Titagarh Marine Limited
|Barrackpore
|Public
|Titagarh Group
|
|-
|Vadyar Boats
|Chennai
|Private
|
|
|}

 
 
Shipbuilding